"Love in the First Degree" is a song written by Jim Hurt and Tim DuBois, and recorded by American country music band Alabama.  It was released in October 1981 as the third single from the band's album Feels So Right.  It became the group's fifth straight No. 1 single (and second multi-week No. 1) on the Billboard magazine Hot Country Singles chart.

"Love in the First Degree" became Alabama's biggest crossover hit, peaking at No. 15 on the Billboard Hot 100 in early 1982.

Background
As with the previous single, "Feels So Right," the song's pop "love ballad" style — along with the country rock style of its other songs — became the cornerstone of Alabama's sound throughout the 1980s and 1990s. Today, "Love in the First Degree" remains one of Alabama's most popular songs.

Content
The song, a mid-tempoed song with a strong country-pop beat, uses the analogy of being found guilty of a crime (this time, of love) and the perpetrator throwing himself on the mercy of the object of his affection.

Charts

References

Works cited
Morris, Edward, "Alabama," Contemporary Books Inc., Chicago, 1985
[ Allmusic — Feels So Right by Alabama].

1981 singles
1981 songs
Alabama (American band) songs
Songs written by Tim DuBois
Song recordings produced by Harold Shedd
RCA Records singles
Songs written by Jim Hurt